Lukáš Rohan (born 30 May 1995) is a Czech slalom canoeist who has competed at the international level since 2010. He is from Mělník, Czech Republic but lives and trains in Prague. Lukáš now competes solely in the C1 discipline, however he competed in the C2 discipline alongside Adam Svoboda and Martin Říha at different times between 2010 and 2015. He is coached by his father, Olympic silver medallist Jiří Rohan.

Rohan won a silver medal in the C1 event at the 2020 Summer Olympics in Tokyo.

He also won a silver medal in the C1 team event at the 2021 World Championships in Bratislava.

He won three medals at the European Championships including a silver medal in the C1 event at the 2020 European Championships in Prague and a silver and a bronze medal in the C1 team event at the 2014 and 2018 events, respectively. He has also won a myriad of medals at the U23 and Junior levels in both C1 and C2. Lukáš earned his best senior world championship result, of 26th, at the 2019 ICF Canoe Slalom World Championships in La Seu d'Urgell.

Results

World Cup individual podiums

Complete World Cup results

Notes
No overall rankings were determined by the ICF, with only two races possible due to the COVID-19 pandemic.

References

External links

1995 births
Living people
Czech male canoeists
Medalists at the 2020 Summer Olympics
Olympic canoeists of the Czech Republic
Olympic medalists in canoeing
Olympic silver medalists for the Czech Republic
People from Mělník
Canoeists at the 2020 Summer Olympics
Medalists at the ICF Canoe Slalom World Championships
Sportspeople from the Central Bohemian Region